Stuart Pankin (born April 8, 1946) is an American actor. He is known for his role as anchor Bob Charles in Not Necessarily the News and as the voice of Earl Sinclair in Dinosaurs. Stuart is also known for his portrayal of Commander Edward Plank in the Zenon trilogy films, and Orthodox Jew Ben Heineman in Curb Your Enthusiasm, as well as making many guest appearances in many television shows and for lending his voice to various animated shows and films. Among his approximately three dozen films was Hollywood Knights. He also appeared in Honey, We Shrunk Ourselves and Arachnophobia and as Jimmy in Fatal Attraction.

Early life and education
Pankin was born in Philadelphia, Pennsylvania, on April 8, 1946. He attended Dickinson College, where he was a member of Sigma Alpha Epsilon, and Columbia University.

Career
Early in his career, Pankin frequently performed at St. Vincent Summer Theatre and still returns to perform there often. Pankin is known for his portrayal as anchor Bob Charles on HBO's Not Necessarily the News, as well for voicing Earl Sinclair in the family sitcom Dinosaurs, he is also known for playing the father Mike Dooley on the short-lived sitcom Nearly Departed. Pankin also played an Orthodox Jew in Curb Your Enthusiasm. Pankin made many guest appearances and lent his voice to animated shows, as well for appearing in numerous television commercials.

One of Pankin's earliest film appearances was as asthmatic musician/magician Dudley Laywicker in Hollywood Knights.  Among his approximately three dozen film appearances, he starred in Zenon: Girl of the 21st Century, Zenon: The Zequel, and Zenon: Z3 as Commander Plank. He also appeared in Honey, We Shrunk Ourselves, as the brother of Wayne Szalinski, and also co-starred as a bossy, self-important lawman in the horror/comedy Arachnophobia.

Pankin also appeared as an absent-minded professor in a series of edutainment 3D films (Encounter in the Third Dimension and Misadventures in 3D), designed for large-screen IMAX theaters. He has been a spokesman in infomercials, including for the  WalkFit Phase 4 Orthotics shoe insert.

Although Pankin is known for comedy roles and game show appearances (e.g., The $100,000 Pyramid), he has sometimes also taken dramatic roles, such as in the thriller Fatal Attraction.

Pankin also appeared on Ken Reid's TV Guidance Counselor Podcast on January 24, 2017.

Personal life
Pankin has been married to actress Joy Pankin since 1974; together they have a son, Andy.

Filmography

Film

Television

Video games

Radio

Web

Theatre

Awards and nominations

References

External links

1946 births
Living people
American male film actors
American male television actors
American male voice actors
Dickinson College alumni
Male actors from Philadelphia
20th-century American male actors
21st-century American male actors
Columbia University alumni
20th-century American Jews
21st-century American Jews